Richard Yuen Ming-fai, GBS, JP (born 6 March 1956), is the former Commissioner of Customs and Excise for the Customs and Excise Department of Hong Kong.

Background
Richard Yuen joined the Administrative Service in August 1980.  He has served in various bureaux and departments including the former Security Branch, the former Home Affairs Department, the former Urban Services Department, the former Home Affairs Branch, the former City and New Territories Administration, the former Councils and Administration Branch, the former Finance Branch, the former Chief Secretary's Office, and the former Economic Services Branch. He was Deputy Secretary for Economic Services from October 1996 to August 1999; Private Secretary to the Chief Executive from August 1999 to October 2002; Deputy Director in the Chief Executive's Office from March 2003 to October 2003; and Commissioner of Insurance from December 2003 to July 2006. He was the Deputy Secretary for Health, Welfare and Food from January 2007 to June 2007. Yuen was succeeded by Clement Cheung for political reasons in September 2011.

References

Living people
Government officials of Hong Kong
Hong Kong civil servants
1956 births
Recipients of the Gold Bauhinia Star